is a Japanese voice actress from Aomori Prefecture who is affiliated with HoriPro International. She began her career after participating in a voice acting audition held by Horipro in 2011. She played her first main role as Akiko Himenokōji in the 2012 anime series OniAi; she is also known for her roles as Natsuki Andō in Chronicles of the Going Home Club, Nanami Knight Bladefield in If Her Flag Breaks, Megumi Jinno in Eromanga Sensei, and Mio Minato in Aikatsu Friends!. From 2014 to 2017, she was a member of the singing duo Everying! together with Erii Yamazaki.

Biography
Kido was born in Aomori Prefecture on November 14, 1997. She had wanted to pursue a career in acting since she was three years old, when she began doing "pretend plays". During her fourth year of elementary school, she developed an interest in anime after watching the television series Shugo Chara! The acting performance of Nana Mizuki, who played the role of Utau Hoshina in the series, left a major impression of her and helped influence her decision to pursue voice acting as a career. To practice her skills, she would mute the television whenever an anime series was airing, and she would voice over what was being played.

In 2011, Kido joined an audition held by the talent agency Horipro. She ended up as a finalist at the competition, which was eventually won by Azusa Tadokoro. She then became affiliated with Horipro, and the following year she played her first anime role as an executive committee member in the anime series Amagami SS+ plus. At the age of 14, she played her first main role as Akiko Himenokōji in the anime series OniAi; she and fellow cast members Minori Chihara, Asami Shimoda, and Eri Kitamura performed the song "Life-Ru is Love-Ru!!" which was used as the ending theme to the series.

In 2013, Kido played the roles of Kasumi Shinomiya in GJ Club, Ria Hagry in Oreimo, and Natsuki Ando in Chronicles of the Going Home Club. The following year, she played the roles of Rinka Urushiba in Tokyo ESP, Claire Rouge in Bladedance of Elementalers, and Nanami Knight Bladefield in If Her Flag Breaks. She also voiced Cocorobo, a robotic vacuum cleaner developed by Sharp. She then formed the singing duo Everying! together with Erii Yamazaki, a fellow Horipro artist; the name of the duo is derived from the names of its two members.

In 2015, she played the roles of Hibiki Amami in Re-Kan! and Sakuya Shimazu in Isuca. The following year, she played the roles of Chisame Nakano in Bakuon!! and Minami Tani in Pan de Peace! In 2017, she played the role of Megumi Jinno in Eromanga Sensei. That same year it was announced that Everying would go on indefinite hiatus to coincide with each member turning 20 years old. In 2018, she was cast as the character Mio Minato in the series Aikatsu Friends!

Filmography

TV anime

Animated films

Video games

Dubbing

References

External links
 Official agency profile  
 

1997 births
Living people
Horipro artists
Japanese child actresses
Japanese video game actresses
Japanese voice actresses
People from Aomori (city)
Voice actresses from Aomori Prefecture